Everyone's Talking is a Canadian piano rock band formed in 2008 in Toronto. The group consists of Evan Kuhn (vocals, guitar) and Dani Rosenoer (vocals, piano). Both members share the songwriting responsibilities. The band has released two EP's "Chapter 1" (2008) and "Chapter 2" (2009) and a full-length album "Dragonflies" (2009) produced by the Grammy Award winner David Bottrill.

History
In November 2009, the band made their Dragonflies release available for download on a pay what you want basis on their official website.

After the 2010 Haiti earthquake, in order to help the survivors the band announced that they would donate all profits made from album downloads in the last week of January 2010 to Médecins Sans Frontières. That year the band was nominated for Best Alternative Rock recording at the Toronto Independent Music Awards.

The group played their first show outside of Canada in Monterrey, Mexico on August 13, 2010.

Discography

Albums
 Dragonflies (2009)

EPs
 Chapter 1: Desedero (2008)
 Chapter 2: Adventure (2009)
 Chapter 3: Remix (2010)

Singles
 "Dragonflies" (2009)
 "War Pt.1" (2010)

References

External links
"INTERVIEW: Everyone’s Talking". Promos 4 Awareness, 16 February 2010] 

Musical groups established in 2008
Musical groups from Toronto
Canadian pop rock music groups
2008 establishments in Ontario